The Graduate School College for Women, Jamshedpur, established in 1971, is one of the oldest degree college in the Jharkhand state of India. It offers undergraduate and postgraduate courses in arts, commerce and sciences. affiliated to  Kolhan University, Chaibasa.

See also
Education in India
Literacy in India
List of institutions of higher education in Jharkhand

References

External links
graduatecollege.ac.in//

Colleges affiliated to Kolhan University
Educational institutions established in 1971
Universities and colleges in Jharkhand
Education in Jamshedpur